ModelRight is a database design and data modeling tool developed by ModelRight Inc. It is used by data modelers, database developers and database architects to create, visualize, and document their databases as an Entity Relationship Diagram (ERD).

Features
 Reverse Engineer an existing database
 Generate SQL DDL to create a database
 Compare a data model and a database
 Compare a data model with another data model
 Document a database with notes, definitions, and revision notes
 Automation and scripting support
 Model subset management
 Generate HTML reports
 Supports large, complex data modeling and data warehousing projects
 Generate model contents as XML

Database support

ModelRight works with

 SQL Server
 Oracle
 PostgreSQL
 MySQL
 DB2
 Access

Support
 IDEF1X
 Information Engineering (IE)/Crow's Foot Notation
 UML Class Diagrams
 Barker Notation

See also
 Relational Model
 RDBMS
 Data warehouse
 Entity-relationship model

References

External links 
 modelright.com

Data modeling
Data modeling tools
Oracle database tools
Microsoft database software
MySQL